Diphysa is a genus of flowering plants in the legume family, Fabaceae. It belongs to the subfamily Faboideae, and was recently assigned to the informal monophyletic Dalbergia clade of the Dalbergieae.

References

External links 
 

Dalbergieae
Fabaceae genera